The Olympus PEN E-P5 is a mirrorless interchangeable-lens camera in the micro four thirds system released in October 2013. This is, despite its number, the fourth model in the PEN E-P range. It remained the latest model in the E-P series until the introduction of the E-P7 in the summer of 2021.  It includes the same 16 MP sensor as the Olympus OM-D E-M5. The E-P5 comes in three colour schemes; black, silver and white.

Specifications:

16MP Four Thirds sized (13x17.3mm) Live MOS sensor
1/8000s top shutter speed
5-axis image stabilization with panning detection 
ISO 100 – 25,600
Burst rate: up to 9 frames per second (5 with continuous auto focus)
Focus-peaking to assist manual focus
Intervalometer and Time Lapse movie creation (up to 99 frames)
3" LCD touchscreen
Built-in Wi-Fi for remote shooting (full control of all settings), image transfer and adding geolocation through smartphone

Compared to its predecessor Olympus PEN E-P3 

 improved 5-axis sensor stabilization vs 3-axis sensor stabilization
 enhanced in-camera RAW conversion
 HDR bracketing
 fastest shutter speed 1/8000s vs 1/4000s - 1 EV faster
 Wi-Fi connectivity
 9 fps burst rate vs 3 fps
 new 16 MPx sensor from the E-M5 vs 12 MPx
 higher maximum ISO: 25,600 vs 12,800
 tilting LCD screen vs fixed LCD screen
 Ergonomics: The thumb roller and the adjusting wheel around the d-pad have been replaced with customizable top dials.

Compared to the Olympus OM-D E-M5 
In 2012, Olympus started the OM-D series with the E-M5 as their more professional line compared to their PEN series, which had been running for a few years. Back in the day, the main criticism for the PEN series was the lack of built-in viewfinder, the lack of weather-sealing and the weird ergonomics for some. Olympus worked on fixing these when they made the E-M5, and some of its features slid down into the E-P5.

 The E-P5 got the new 16 MPx sensor from the E-M5. Previously, every Olympus Micro Four Thirds camera had a 12 MPx sensor.
 The E-P5 got the 5-axis sensor stabilization with 4 EV efficiency.
 The same 9 fps burst. The low burst rate was a common weakness of previous Micro Four Thirds cameras.
 Tilting rear LCD screen.

There were features where the E-P5 was even better than the E-M5:

 It had 1/8000s fastest shutter speed instead of 1/4000s.
 It had a lot higher resolution back LCD screen: 1.03 million pixels vs 610k
 It had built-in Wi-Fi capabilities.
 It had a built-in flash.

However, the E-M5 had a major feature, the built-in electronic viewfinder, which the PEN series lacked until the PEN F's digital version, which was released in 2016. The EVF became a mainstream feature in the lower categories of mirrorless cameras as well, so the PEN series went to a decline, and a new camera in the main PEN series was not seen again until the E-P7 in 2021.

References

PEN E-P5
Cameras introduced in 2013